The Gifted is the third studio album by American rapper Wale. The album was released on June 25, 2013 by Maybach Music Group, Allido Records, and Atlantic Records. The production on the album was handled by multiple producers including Just Blaze, Jake One, Kane Beatz, Cardiak, The Runners and Lee Major among others. The album also features guest appearances from Meek Mill, Nicki Minaj, Rihanna, Ne-Yo, Rick Ross, Wiz Khalifa and 2 Chainz among others. 

The Gifted was supported by four official singles— "Bad", "LoveHate Thing", "Bad (Remix)" and "Clappers". The album received generally positive reviews from music critics and was a commercial success. It debuted at number one on the US Billboard 200 chart, selling 158,000 copies in its first week. In June 2016, the album was certified gold by the Recording Industry Association of America (RIAA).

Background
On November 25, 2011, shortly after the release of Ambition, Wale announced on Twitter that he had already begun working on his third album. In November 2012, during an interview with MTV, Wale explained he would be taking a new approach with his third studio album, saying: "I just wanna show range. I proved a lot to my peers and to myself and to my fans so I just wanna take it back to something a little more exciting. When the music was most exciting to me. Kinda like when I was in my best pocket…Just for being swarmed in my own stuff and doing Self Made and all those things. I haven’t had an opportunity to stand on my own sonically as an artist as much as I would like. This new project I’m working on is definitely allowing me to do that." He also explained that he would be taking his time on the album, saying: "It’s not coming as quick as like a lot of other projects. Self Made I could just hit a beat, but now I’m like ‘Alright, I don’t like the strings. Take that out. Let’s try this. I don’t like the percussion so let’s change the snare.’ I might be doing it myself on some of the songs on there so it's a little bit different." In March 2013, when speaking of his third studio album Wale said, "I'm dropping my third solo album first, then a couple months after I'll probably drop the Nothing project. I'm very creative, I'm knee deep in that joint. It's kind of like a persona; thing; I design my records and the sound a certain way for two different projects. It's going to have one sound, very, very soulful" and the first single, "Bad" is a pretty good indication of the direction I'm going for this project."

On March 20, 2013, during an interview with MTV, Wale explained why he is tired of talking about music and said that he is ready to let his music speak for itself, saying: "I'm not even gonna do all that other stuff. I'ma talk with the music. Until my album drop, until June 25, I'ma talk loud with the music, I've done everything I could do, I've said everything I could say. I've kissed the babies, I've shook the hands now let's let the music talk because I ain't about to come here and tell y'all exactly how I feel no more. I'ma let it all sing in the music." The album cover was released on May 15, 2013. Wale along with famed Mr. Cartoon designed the cover. On May 21, 2013, the album was made available for pre order on iTunes revealing a track listing without any guest appearances. On May 31, 2013, the final track listing was released revealing guest appearances on the album from Meek Mill, CeeLo Green, Yo Gotti, Lyfe Jennings, Nicki Minaj, Juicy J, Rihanna, Ne-Yo, Rick Ross, Wiz Khalifa, 2 Chainz, Jerry Seinfeld and Tiara Thomas. In June 2013, during an interview with The Washington Post, he explained the inspiration behind the album, saying "This album kind of wrote itself, in a way. I just used my inspiration. I would use Marvin Gaye's music to inspire "LoveHate Thing". I would use Michael Jackson to inspire "Tired of Dreaming." I would use Michael Jordan's career to inspire "88"."

Release and promotion
On December 24, 2012, Wale released a mixtape titled Folarin in promotion of the album. It featured 21 tracks and guest appearances from Rick Ross, 2 Chainz, Scarface, Nipsey Hussle, Trinidad James, Hit-Boy, French Montana, Jhené Aiko and Chrisette Michele among others.

On March 20, 2013, he announced that the album would be titled The Gifted and would be released on June 25, 2013. On April 28, 2013, Wale released the first of a series of vlogs leading up to the release of the album.

Singles
On February 5, 2013, the first single "Bad" featuring Tiara Thomas was released. The song was originally released on December 24, 2012, on Wale's mixtape Folarin. The music video for "Bad" was directed by Alexandre Moors and premiered on March 20, 2013. "Bad" had peaked at number 21 on the US Billboard Hot 100, making it Wale's second top 40 entry after "Lotus Flower Bomb", and becoming his highest-charting single as a lead artist.

On May 21, 2013, the second single "LoveHate Thing" featuring Sam Dew was released. On June 23, 2013, the music video for "LoveHate Thing" featuring Sam Dew was released.

The remix to "Bad" featuring Rihanna was released to iTunes as the album's third single on June 3, 2013. In late September 2013, "Clappers" was serviced to urban contemporary radio as the album's fourth single. On September 3, 2013, the music video was released for "Clappers" featuring Nicki Minaj and Juicy J. On September 30, 2013, the music video was released for "Golden Salvation (Jesus Piece)". On December 24, 2013, the music video was released for "Heaven's Afternoon" featuring Meek Mill.

Critical reception

The Gifted was met with positive reviews from music critics. At Metacritic, which assigns a weighted mean rating out of 100 to reviews from mainstream critics, the album received an average score of 65, based on 15 reviews, which indicates "generally favorable reviews". David Jeffries of AllMusic gave the album four out of five stars, saying "Besides being solidly built and not overstuffed at 16 tracks long, The Gifted is the fascinating sound of the life of the party growing up, and that's as in "in the process," because there are still plenty of club bangers, strip-club jams, and irresponsible moments, and all of them are welcome." Eric Diep of XXL gave the album an XL, saying "Matching his lyrical abilities with polished production and radio-ready hooks, The Gifted sees Wale inching towards hip-hop’s upper echelon, while still exhibiting the hunger of a young MC on the rise. “Born to lose, built to win,” he claims on “Heaven’s Afternoon.” Started from that bottom, but now he's got it." Jesse Cataldo of Slant Magazine gave the album three out of five stars, saying "When he plays to his strengths on The Gifted, the results are impressive, but more mass-market tracks leave him sounding unoriginal and anonymous." Miles Raymer of Pitchfork gave the album a 5.1 out of ten, saying "What seems to be the main purpose of the record is to elevate Wale beyond the level of Rick Ross’ reliable second-stringer, a guy who's capable of dropping the occasional strip club anthem in between a steady string of unremarkable features on pop songs. “Clappers” proves that when he embraces that job he's actually really good at it. But if he wants to be taken as a serious artist like the ones he spends most of the record emulating, he's going to have to start taking some real chances and get real far out of the box, out to place where people are known to wear kilts."

Brent Faulkner of PopMatters gave the album an eight out of ten, saying "All in all, Wale truly is ‘gifted’. Three albums in, Wale continues to impress with this prodigious rhymes and the ability assemble an album that is both consistent, intellectually stimulating, and enjoyable. Hey, he even makes a booty anthem like “Clapper” sound more refined than it really should be, regardless whether his partners in crime raunch it up. With no big time faux pas to be found, The Gifted is an extraordinary ‘gift’ to any hip-hop collection." Evan Rytlewski of The A.V. Club gave the album a C, saying "The Gifted, however, marks Wale's true moment of no return. Whatever survived of the brain behind Mixtape About Nothing has been permanently atrophied by luxury and laziness." Bruce Smith of HipHopDX gave the album four out of five stars, saying "Overall, The Gifted is a good album. Wale presents substance without being overly preachy, and still takes it back to the Go-Go for those who have been following him since Paint A Picture. While not without its flaws (the “Bad” remix was unnecessary, and probably done simply for the big name feature), those questioning the direction Wale was going post MMG affiliation will more than likely be pleased with The Gifted."

Jeff Weiss of Spin gave the album a six out of ten, saying "There's something about The Gifted that you can't dismiss. Wale has lost many of the qualities that made people like him in the first place, but he's refined the elements that he's managed to retain. He'll never pen another song as poignant as "The Kramer," but back then, he also couldn't write anything as well-crafted as "Bad." He's still the type of guy who wears too much cologne, but at least he's figured out the scent that works best for him." Max Mertens of Now gave the album two out of five stars, saying "A guest verse by 2 Chainz and a brief cameo by none other than Mr. Puffy Shirt himself, Jerry Seinfeld, aren’t enough to keep anybody except Wale diehards from yada yada-ing through this one." Kevin Jones of Exclaim! gave the album a six out of ten, saying "On The Gifted, the DC native attempts to wheel it back a little bit and slip into something with greater depth than his recent offerings, not only showing more focus in his rhymes, but couching them in a more vibrant sound bed of live instrumentation and retro samples. Cuts like "Sunshine," the Dap Kings-featuring "Gullible" and "Vanity" best demonstrate this revamped pose, albeit with mixed results, particularly in the execution of that latter track. However, it's the portions of the record squarely focused at the MMG set that are more miss than hit."

Commercial performance
The Gifted debuted at number one on the US Billboard 200 chart, selling 158,000 copies in its first week. This became Wale's first US number one debut and his second top-ten album. In its second week, the album dropped to number two on the chart, selling an additional 50,000 copies. In its third week, the album dropped to number seven on the chart, selling 28,000 more copies. In its fourth week, the album dropped to number 15 on the chart, selling 18,000 copies. As of March 2015, the album has sold 367,000 copies in the United States.  On June 14, 2016, the album was certified gold by the Recording Industry Association of America (RIAA) for combined sales and album-equivalent units of over 500,000 units.

Track listing

Samples
"Vanity" contains an interpolation of "Mad World" by Gary Jules.

Personnel
Credits adapted from AllMusic.

 2 Chainz – featured artist
 Adothegod – drums, keyboards, producer, programming
 Shajuan Andews – drums
 Chris Athens – mastering
 Marce Ayala – assistant engineer
 Ben Baptie – mixing assistant
 Sam Bohl – assistant engineer, mixing assistant
 Karla Brown – choir/chorus
 Sean C. – producer
 Kelson Camp – drums, keyboards, producer, programming
 Cardiak  – producer
 Jiwoong Cheh – sculpture
 Ariel Chobaz – vocal engineer
 Michael Congdon – engineer
 Josh Connolly – vocal engineer
 Eric Curry – timbales
 Deputy – producer
 Sam Dew –  featured artist, keyboards, piano, producer, vocals, background vocals
 Dave Edgar – cello
 Tom Elmhirst – mixing 
 Trevor Flandris – bass
 Ralph Folarin – producer
 Wale Folarin – executive producer
 Cochemea Gastelum – horn
 Lionel Gray –  producer, background vocals
 Cee Lo Green – featured artist
 Daniel Groover – guitar
 David Guy – horn
 Joe "Thelonius" Harley – keyboards
 Mark Henry –  producer
 Michael "Tecknics" Hernandez – vocal engineer
 Chris Hunt –  drums, tambourine
 Lyfe Jennings – featured artist
 Walker Johnson – vocals
 Juicy J – featured artist, producer
 Just Blaze – mixing, producer
 Gloria Kaba – assistant engineer
 Kane Beatz - producer
 Anthony Kilhoffer –  keyboards, vocals
 Jordan Kinne – assistant
 Christina Kirkland – choir/chorus
 Michael Kuzoian – assistant engineer
 Alexa Lima – piano
 David Linaburg – guitar
 Alexander Mathew Lipinski –  producer
 Craig Love – bass
 LV – producer
 Magazeen Choir – choir/chorus
 Lee Major – producer
 Fabian Marasciullo – mixing
 Andrea Martin – vocals
 Dallas Martin – a&r
 Meek Mill –  featured artist
 William Miller –  sample source
 Nicki Minaj – featured artist
 Lauren Morris – choir/chorus
 Ne-yo – Featured Artist
 Alec Newell – engineer
 Gloria Nissenson –  sample source
 No Credit – engineer, mixing, producer
 Jeremiah Olvera – mixing assistant
 Roland Orzabal –  sample source
 Derek Pacuk – engineer
 Shannon Peters – choir/chorus
 Neal H. Pogue – mixing
 Patrick Postle – bass
 Rich Rich – assistant
 Rihanna – featured artist
 Daniela Rivera – assistant engineer
 Andrew Robertson – assistant engineer
 Marco Robinson – guitar
 Kyle Ross – engineer
 Rick Ross – executive producer, featured artist
 Hod David Schudson –  sample source
 Cody Sciara – assistant, assistant engineer
 Travis Scott – drums, keyboards, producer
 Jerry Seinfeld – featured artist
 Derek Selby – engineer
 Terrence "Scar" Smith – background vocals
 Mark Stevens –  sample source
 Stokley – bass, drum programming, drums, guitar, keyboards, percussion, producer, vocals, background vocals
 Neal Sugarman – horn
 Phil Tan – mixing
 Tiara Thomas – arranger,  featured artist, producer, strings 
 Tone P – additional production, bongos, percussion, producer, programming
 Pat Viala – mixing
 Wale – primary artist
 Jamal Webb – choir/chorus
 Finis "KY" White – vocal engineer, vocal mixing
 Jesse "Corporal" Wilson – producer
 Wiz Khalifa – featured artist
 Stevie Wonder –  sample source
 Andrew Wright – engineer, mixing
 Yo Gotti – featured artist
 Emmanuel Zaragoza – producer
 Danny Zook – sample clearance

Charts

Weekly charts

Year-end charts

Certifications

Release history

References

2013 albums
Wale (rapper) albums
Atlantic Records albums
Maybach Music Group albums
Albums produced by Kane Beatz
Albums produced by Juicy J
Albums produced by Just Blaze
Albums produced by Travis Scott
Albums produced by Jake One
Albums produced by the Inkredibles
Albums produced by Cardiak